Viivikonna is a village in Ida-Viru County, Narva-Jõesuu in Estonia.

References

Villages in Ida-Viru County